Get Up! is an album by the American musicians Charlie Musselwhite and Ben Harper, their twenty-ninth and eleventh album, respectively. It was released in January 2013 under Stax Records. In 2019, the song You Found Another Lover (I Lost Another Friend) was certified Gold by RIAA

The album won a Grammy Award for Best Blues Album in 2014.

Reception

The album has been given a Metacritic score of 79 out of 100 based on 9 reviews, indicating generally favorable reviews.

The album entered the Billboard 200 at No. 27 on its release in the United States. It also debuted at No. 1 on the Blues Albums chart.

Track listing
All tracks composed by Ben Harper; except where indicated

Charts

Year-end charts

Year-end charts

References

Ben Harper albums
Charlie Musselwhite albums
Grammy Award for Best Blues Album
Stax Records albums
2013 albums
Albums produced by Ben Harper
Collaborative albums